Arvid Parly Kleven (29 November 1899 in Trondheim - 23 November 1929 in Kristiania) was a Norwegian composer and flautist.

Biography 
Kleven studied flute in Oslo under Axel Andersen and music theory under Gustav Lange. From 1919 he was a flautist in the orchestra of the Nationaltheater, Later he was solo flutist in the orchestra of the Philharmonic Society of Kristiania. He composed a symphony, a symphonic fantasy, a symphonic poem, an orchestral prelude, chamber music works, piano pieces and songs.

Works 
 1917: Vikingtog, march for piano
 1920: Dæmring for solo piano
 1920: Vandliljer i et tjern
 1920: Poema for Cello og Piano
 1921: Appassionato for solo piano
 1922: Poeme for Obo og Piano
 1922: To historiske bilder for piano
 1922: Lotusland for orchestra
 1922: To Aquareller for orchestra
 Clair De Lune
 Regnbueøen
 1922: Valse Mignonne for chamber orchestra
 1922: Canzonetta for Violin og Piano
 1923: Skogens Søvn for orchestra
 1923: Der Wald Sleep for orchestra
 1924: Sonate 1 for Violin og Piano
 1925: Fiolin Sonate
 1925: 3 Sange for Sopran og Piano
 1925: Piano Trio for violin, cello and piano
 1926: Symfonisk Fantasi
 1926: 3 Sange for Sopran og Piano
 1927: Sinfonia Libera In Due Parte
 1928: Les Preludes, zwei Präludien for piano

References 

1899 births
1929 deaths
20th-century classical composers
Norwegian composers
Norwegian male composers
20th-century Norwegian male musicians